"Cowboys & Kisses" is a song by American singer Anastacia from her debut studio album Not That Kind (2000). Written by Anastacia, JIVE, and Charlie Pennachio, the song was released as the album's third single on January 22, 2001 by Daylight Records and Epic Records.

Critical reception
Tricia Beoy of MTVAsia.com called this song "a simple, anthem-ic, country-flavoured soft rock tune that doesn't work with Anastacia's voice."

Music video
The music video for "Cowboys & Kisses" was filmed on January 8–9, 2001, at the Camarillo Airport in Camarillo, California. It is Anastacia's second video to be directed by Nigel Dick, who also director her debut song "I'm Outta Love". In the video, Anastacia is shown driving to an airplane hangar, while a strange unknown man, who is wearing the same ring as Anastacia, is watching her (on the TV screen). At the airport, she is lip-synching the song together with her background singers. While Anastacia is dressed like a cowgirl, the background singers play operators. The unknown man looks at Anastacia and browses through some files about her. At the end, Anastacia sings on an airplane, whereafter the stranger turns off his TV and Anastacia drives away.

Track listings
 United Kingdom
"Cowboys & Kisses" (Tin Tin Out Radio Mix) – 3:56
"Cowboys & Kisses" (Radio Edit) – 3:33
"I'm Outta Love" (Hex Hector Main Club Mix) – 7:59
"Cowboys & Kisses" (Video)

 Cassette
"Cowboys & Kisses" (Tin Tin Out Radio Mix) – 3:56
"Cowboys & Kisses" (Radio Edit) – 3:33
"I'm Outta Love" (Hex Hector Radio Edit) – 4:01

 Italy
"Cowboys & Kisses" (Radio Edit) – 3:33
"Cowboys & Kisses" (Unplugged Version) – 3:57
"Nothin' at All" – 4:28
"I'm Outta Love" (A cappella version) - 3:55

 Germany
 "Cowboys & Kisses" (Album Version) – 4:42
 "Underdog" – 4:57
 "Nothin' at All" – 4:28
 "I'm Outta Love" (A cappella version) – 3:55

 Australia
"Cowboys & Kisses" (Radio Edit) – 3:33
"Cowboys & Kisses" (Unplugged Version) – 3:57
"Underdog" – 4:57
"Not That Kind" (Mousse T Remix) – 3:25
"Not That Kind" (Hex Hector Radio Edit) – 3:16

Charts

Release history

References

Songs about cowboys and cowgirls
2000 songs
2000s ballads
2001 singles
American soft rock songs
Anastacia songs
Country ballads
Daylight Records singles
Epic Records singles
Music videos directed by Nigel Dick
Pop ballads
Rock ballads
Song recordings produced by Ric Wake
Songs written by Anastacia
Songs written by Jive Jones